Maciej Boryna (born 28 March 1974 in Szprotawa/Sprottau) is Polish journalist and scientific researcher, author of many books of Silesian history, founder and director of Regional History Museum F.Matuszkiewicz's in Szprotawa, co-founder and first president of Lower Silesian Forest Institute, state keeper of monuments and nature, alderman in Szprotawa (2006–2010), member in Żagański-District board of directors (since 2010), member of the Sword of Freedom.

Director of researching program "Silesian Walls" and "Chrobry fortified village in Szprotawa", designer of forest preserve "Slavic Park". Awarded by Polish Ministry of Culture and National Heritage (2008), medal of Honored for Commune Szprotawa (2002).

2017-2018 he has successfully fought about close of the minacious landfill site in Kartowice (Poland), 2018 falsely accused of character assassination regarding the company Suez Zachód, won a lawsuit 2019.

His books and publications

Szprotawskie karty. Szprotawa jakiej już nie ma., 1996
Sensacje Ziemi Szprotawskiej, 2000
Tajemnice Szprotawy i okolic, 2001
Program rozwoju turystyki w Gminie Wymiarki, 2002 wspólnie z J.Ryszawy
Gmina Wymiarki. Rys historyczny., 2003
Szprotawa i okolice (red.), 2003–2004 (4 numery)
Flins na Dolnym Śląsku, Łużycach i w Saksonii, 2004
Klaus Haensch. Pomiędzy Szprotawą a Europą, 2005
Gminna Ewidencja Zabytków – Gm. Szprotawa, 2005
Tajemnice militarne Szprotawy na Dolnym Śląsku, 2006
Stan turystyki w Gm. Szprotawa. Program rozwoju turystyki w Gm. Szprotawa, 2007
Dokumentacja projektowa Zespołu Przyrodniczo-Krajobrazowego "Park Słowiański" w Szprotawie, 2007
Gminna Ewidencja Zabytków – Gm. Wymiarki, 2007
Stan turystyki w Gm. Małomice. Program rozwoju turystyki w Gm. Małomice, 2007
Małomice na rubieży Borów Dolnośląskich, 2008 
Powiat Żagański. Książęca Kraina., 2009 współautor
Szprotawa i okolice. Na tropach historii i przyrody, 2010 wspólnie z prof. Hieronimem Szczegółą
Encyklopedia Ziemi Szprotawskiej i Żagańskiej (red.), 2010
Wały Śląskie. Tajemnice dawnych granic, 2011
Dawne życie mieszkańców Borów Dolnośląskich na przykładzie Lubiechowa w byłym powiecie szprotawskim, 2013
Historia i architektura Bramy Żagańskiej w Szprotawie, 2013 with A.Cichalewska
Felix Matuszkiewicz ze Szprotawy. Serce w Szprotawie zostawione, 2014 with K.Danielkowska
Szkice z dziejów Jelenina w gminie Żagań, 2014 with H.Janowicz
Dawne dzieje Leszna Górnego w Borach Dolnośląskich, 2014 with K.Danielkowska
Wiechlice na rubieży Borów Dolnośląskich, 2015 with D.Grzeszczak
Z Kresów na Kresy, 2015
Wędrówki po Puszczy Wiechlickiej, 2015 with H.Janowicz
Przykłady budownictwa obronnego ziemi szprotawskiej, Żary 2015, praca dyplomowa pod kierunkiem dr G.Popowa
Co kryją Stawy Bobrowickie w Borach Dolnośląskich, 2017 with M.Krzak
Gościeszowice i Międzylesie w gminie Niegosławice – Historie nieznane, 2018 with H.Janowicz
Drogi i trasy rowerowe w Gminie Szprotawa. Analiza stanu, potrzeb i możliwości, Szprotawa 2019
Założenia do koncepcji zagospodarowania Parku Goepperta w Szprotawie, 2020 with J.Ryszawy
Zespół Przyrodniczo-Krajobrazowy Potok Sucha w gminie Szprotawa. Przewodnik turystyczny., Szprotawa 2022

Journeys and scientific research
 Archaeological sites in the Jesus Church in Szprotawa (2000)
 Expedition to the source of Czerna River (2002)
 Expedition to the source of Bóbr (2003)
 Expedition to the source of Kwisa (2004)
 Exploration in the tower of St. Maria Church in Szprotawa (2005)
 Research Program "Castle in Sprottau" (2006)
 Exploration in the Tomb of the Order of Mary the Magdala in Szprotawa (2009)
 Archaeological sites in the Silesia Wall, under the patronage of Polish Academy of Sciences (2008)
 Archaeological sites in the Chrobry fortified village, under the patronage of Polish Academy of Sciences (2008–2009)
 Discovery of German Bunkers from Third Reich in Lower Silesian Wilderness (2009)
 Discovery of many new fragments of the Silesian Walls (2008–2010)
 Discovery of penitential cross from Lubiechów (2010)
 Discovery of penitential cross from Długie (2010)
 Research Program "Dunes and periodic waters in Lower Silesian Wilderness" (cince 2011)

References

External links
 http://www.naukawpolsce.pap.pl/aktualnosci/news,380377,kolo-wsi-lipno-w-lubuskiem-odkryto-kolejne-fragmenty-walow-slaskich.html
 http://www.tvp.pl/gorzow-wielkopolski/aktualnosci/spoleczne/sladami-walow/4116906
 http://www.national-geographic.pl/aktualnosci/pokaz/odkryto-skamienialosci-roslinne-w-borach-dolnoslaskich/
 http://www.national-geographic.pl/artykuly/pokaz/odkryto-fragmenty-walow-slaskich-kolo-lipna/
 http://www.naukawpolsce.pap.pl/aktualnosci/news,359423,w-szprotawie-odkryto-sredniowieczne-grodzisko.html
 http://kultura.wiara.pl/doc/927398.Jak-Pan-Samochodzik
 http://wiadomosci.wp.pl/title,Sensacyjne-odkrycie-archeologow-w-Lubuskiem,wid,10884626,wiadomosc.html?ticaid=1dc68
 http://www.wprost.pl/ar/154536/Ilavia-odnaleziona/
 http://www.zachod.pl/radio-zachod/serwis-informacyjny/region/dawne-zycie-mieszkancow-borow-dolnoslaskich/
 http://zielonagora.naszemiasto.pl/artykul/galeria/1389267,rewitalizacja-historycznego-drogowskazu-zdjecia,id,t.html
 http://zielonagora.gazeta.pl/zielonagora/1,35182,11220708,Budowali_market__a_odkryli_starozytne_artefakty.html
 http://wiadomosci.onet.pl/regionalne/wroclaw/wyjatkowy-artefakt-w-borach-dolnoslaskich,1,4886009,wiadomosc.html
 http://polskalokalna.pl/wiadomosci/dolnoslaskie/news/skamienialosci-roslinne-w-borach-dolnoslaskich,1710808,218
 http://www.gazetalubuska.pl/apps/pbcs.dll/article?AID=/20100207/TURYSTYKA04/384447108
 http://www.fakt.pl/Pogrzebana-zywcem,artykuly,41819,1.html
 http://www.naukawpolsce.pap.pl/aktualnosci/news,385528,w-borach-dolnoslaskich-odkryto-skamienialosci-roslinne.html

1974 births
Living people
Polish journalists
Polish male writers
Polish explorers